Prof Jacobus Cornelius Kapteyn FRS FRSE LLD (19 January 1851 – 18 June 1922) was a Dutch astronomer.  He carried out extensive studies of the Milky Way and was the discoverer of evidence for galactic rotation. Kapteyn was also among the first to suggest the existence of dark matter using stellar velocities as early as 1922.

Kapteyn's family and early life 
Kapteyn was born in Barneveld in the Netherlands to Gerrit J. and Elisabeth C. (née Koomans) Kapteyn, and was one of 15 children. Many of the Kapteyns were gifted in mathematics and physics. He passed his entrance exams for university at the age of 16 but Kapteyn's parents wouldn't allow him to go until the following year. He went to the University of Utrecht to study mathematics and physics in 1868. He did very well in his studies and when he graduated he was magna cum laude. This laid the foundation for his later career.

Jacobus Kapteyn was a very doting father during the earlier years in his career and took an interactive role which during the 1880s was not done much by fathers. When Kapteyn's children reached schooling age both his daughters, Jacoba Cornelia and Henrietta, and his son, Gerrit, went to a boys' school. His daughters later made significant strides for women by going to university to read law and medicine. His daughter Henrietta (1881–1956) married astronomer Ejnar Hertzsprung and gave him a granddaughter named Rigel.

Career 
In 1875, after having finished his thesis, he worked for three years at the Leiden Observatory. In 1878 Kapteyn was inducted as the first professor of astronomy and theoretical mechanics at the University of Groningen. Also at Groningen, he founded the Astronomical Laboratory in 1896 and consequently became the director of the facility. Kapteyn fulfilled both occupational roles as professor and director at Groningen until his retirement in 1921. In 1888 he became a member of the Royal Netherlands Academy of Arts and Sciences.

Between 1896 and 1900, lacking an observatory, he volunteered to measure photographic plates taken by David Gill, who was conducting a photographic survey of southern hemisphere stars at the Royal Observatory at the Cape of Good Hope. To measure these plates he used a special parallactic instrument that Kapteyn himself had constructed. The results of this collaboration was the publication of Cape Photographic Durchmusterung, a catalog listing positions and magnitudes for 454,875 stars in the Southern Hemisphere.

In 1897, as part of the above work, he discovered Kapteyn's Star. It had the highest proper motion of any star known until the discovery of Barnard's Star in 1916.

In 1904, studying the proper motions of stars, Kapteyn reported that these were not random, as it was believed in that time; stars could be divided into two streams, moving in nearly opposite directions. It was later realized that Kapteyn's data had been the first evidence of the rotation of our Galaxy, which ultimately led to the finding of galactic rotation by Bertil Lindblad and Jan Oort.

In 1906, Kapteyn launched a plan for a major study of the distribution of stars in the Galaxy, using counts of stars in different directions. The plan involved measuring the apparent magnitude, spectral type, radial velocity, and proper motion of stars in 206 zones. This enormous project was the first coordinated statistical analysis in astronomy and involved the cooperation of over forty different observatories.

Around 1913 Kapteyn developed a theory of how stars were made based on his observations of irregular nebulae and their velocities. He theorized that stars in irregular nebulae eventually evolved into planetary nebulae. Although this theory is not entirely correct it did have some redeeming qualities.

He was awarded the James Craig Watson Medal in 1913. The year of 1920 Kapteyn took a part-time job at University of Leiden after leaving the university of Groningen. This move made Kapteyn able to see his granddaughter Rigel and his daughter Henrietta. In Kapteyn's later years of work he spent his time working on the combination of his life's work revising and editing the Kapteyn Universe. Kapteyn later retired in 1921 at the age of seventy, but on the request of his former student and director of Leiden Observatory Willem de Sitter, Kapteyn went back to Leiden to assist in upgrading the observatory to contemporary astronomical standards.

The astronomy institute of the University of Groningen is named after Kapteyn. A street in the city of Groningen is also named after Kapteyn: the J.C. Kapteynlaan. And the Isaac Newton Group of Telescopes on La Palma in the Canary Islands named the Jacobus Kapteyn Telescope (JKT) after him.

The Kapteyn Universe 
The structure and size of the galaxy was of great interest to many astronomers during Kapteyn's time. Around 1900, Hugo von Seeliger made an attempt at discerning the structure of the galaxy by making counts of stars between successive magnitudes. Ultimately, von Seeliger was able to determine the rates at which the galaxy was diminishing in multiple different areas of the sky. In 1901, Kapteyn employed the proper motions technique and derived a statistical approach that allowed him to estimate the average distance to stars between successive magnitudes, effectively providing a scale for von Seeliger's discoveries. Conclusive results from von Seeliger and Kapteyn estimated the galaxy to be an oblate star system approximately 10 kpc in width and 2 kpc in thickness, the Sun being relatively close (0.6 kpc) to the center. Using the method of star counts, Kapteyn was able to confirm his results and dubbed his findings as his first model of the galaxy.

Despite having made great strides and providing a model for the galaxy, there was one major issue. Kapteyn's work was based on an unproven presumption, that is, there is no light absorption in space. If there were light absorption in space, then stars would look more faint, thus, seeming further away than they actually are. Light absorption would also cause the galaxy to disperse more quickly than it actually does. If light absorption proved to be a considerable factor, then Kapteyn's work, or at least his conclusions, would more or less be obsolete. To circumvent this dilemma, Kapteyn spent years studying and measuring the amount of absorption. In 1917, Kapteyn's assumptions on interstellar absorption were debated. The arguments were centered around an issue with the "zone of avoidance". By 1918, he was convinced light absorption was of negligible amounts and confidently stood behind his first model for the structure of the galaxy.

Kapteyn had presented his findings in his life's work, First Attempt at a Theory of the Arrangement and Motion of the Sidereal System, which was published in 1922. Kapteyn's model and distance scale were challenged by Anton Pannekoek and Harlow Shapley, among others, but Kapteyn was not well enough to meet with his peers and discuss his work. He died in June 1922, soon after its publishing. It was only after Kapteyn's death that Robert Trumpler determined that the amount of interstellar reddening was actually much greater than had been assumed. This discovery estimated the size of the galaxy to be about 2.5 times larger than initially was thought, with the Sun replaced to a distance of 9.2 kpc from the Galactic Center.

Honours

Awards
Gold Medal of the Royal Astronomical Society (1902)
James Craig Watson Medal (1913)
Bruce Medal (1913)

Named after him
Kapteyn (crater) on the Moon
Asteroid 818 Kapteynia
Kapteyn's Star
Kapteyn Astronomical Institute at the University of Groningen
Jacobus Kapteyn Telescope (JKT) at La Palma, one of the Canary islands
Kapteyn Package, Astronomical package for Python

References

External links
History of the Kapteyn Institute

1851 births
1922 deaths
People from Barneveld
19th-century Dutch astronomers
Utrecht University alumni
Academic staff of the University of Groningen
Recipients of the Bruce Medal
Recipients of the Gold Medal of the Royal Astronomical Society
Foreign Members of the Royal Society
Foreign associates of the National Academy of Sciences
Corresponding members of the Saint Petersburg Academy of Sciences
Members of the Royal Netherlands Academy of Arts and Sciences
Honorary Fellows of the Royal Society of Edinburgh
Recipients of the Pour le Mérite (civil class)